{{Infobox person
| name        = Édouard Hervé
| image       = Édouard Hervé.jpg
| alt         = 
| caption     = 
| birth_name  = 
| birth_date  = 
| birth_place = Saint-Denis, La Réunion. France
| death_date  = 
| death_place = Paris, France
| nationality = French
| other_names = 
| occupation  = Journalist, Historian
| known_for   = Founder of Le Soleil
}}
Édouard Hervé (28 May 1835 – 4 January 1899) was a French journalist, historian and politician.

Life

Édouard Hervé was born in Saint-Denis, La Réunion on 28 May 1835.

A graduate of the École Normale Supérieure, Paris city councilor and advisor to Philippe d'Orléans, Count of Paris (1838–1894), he worked at several newspapers, including Le Journal de Genève (1865–1866) and L'Époque. In 1867, he founded the Journal de Paris.
This newspaper was suppressed by the Paris Commune in 1871 when he wrote of the events of March: "The way the population of Paris yesterday expressed its satisfaction was more than frivolous, and we fear it gets worse with time. Paris now has a festive look that is totally inappropriate, and if we do not want to be called Parisians of decadence, we must put an end to this state of affairs. "

In 1873, he founded Le Soleil, the first major daily newspaper priced at 5 centimes.
With a monarchist viewpoint, publication was to continue until June 1915.
Hervé became a member of the Paris municipal council.
He belonged to both the Conférence Molé and the Conférence Tocqueville before their merger to form the Conférence Molé-Tocqueville.

Édouard Hervé is also the author of several historical works, which are actually compilations of his articles.
He was made Chevalier of the Legion of Honour in 1873 and elected member of the Académie française on 11 February 1886.
He died on 4 January 1899 in Paris.

Historical works
 Une page de l'histoire d'Angleterre. Les Élections de 1868. Le Cabinet Gladstone. La Réforme de l'Église d'Irlande (1869)
 La Crise irlandaise, depuis la fin du dix-huitième siècle jusqu'à nos jours (1885)
 Trente Ans de politique, quelques articles et discours'' (1899)

References

Sources

1835 births
1899 deaths
People from Saint-Denis, Réunion
19th-century French historians
French politicians
19th-century French journalists
French male journalists
19th-century French newspaper publishers (people)
19th-century French newspaper founders
French male writers
19th-century French male writers